Grapevine virus D (GVB) is a plant virus species in the genus Vitivirus, associated with rugose 
wood condition of grapevine.

See also 
 List of viruses

References

External links 
 ICTV Virus Taxonomy 2009
 UniProt Taxonomy

Betaflexiviridae
Viral grape diseases